The list of ship launches in 1993 includes a chronological list of all ships launched in 1993.


References

1993
Ship launches